The spotted broad-blazed slider (Lerista stictopleura) is a species of skink found in Western Australia.

References

Lerista
Reptiles described in 1985
Taxa named by Glen Milton Storr